The Lost Dream is a romantic drama television series which premiered 4 November 2008, on MBC 4.

Characters
Omer just moved to Istanbul to get a job after the death of his family.
Pinar is the teenage girl who falls in love with Omer.
Nagaty is Panar's father.
Asmaa is Pinar's best friend, and discovers (in episode 75) that she is the lost sister of Omer.
Alyaa is the woman who is trying to steal Omer from Pinar.

Plot
Omer moves to Istanbul to get a job and live a normal life after he experiences the death of his whole family, except his sister, who is lost. Omer falls in love with Pinar, though her father, Nagaty, is angry about their relationship and Pinar does not know why. Later she discovers that Nagaty took some extra money to build poorly constructed buildings, which collapsed in an earthquake, killing many people including Omer's family. Pinar looks for the right way to tell Omer of everything but she cannot do it. Later Omer discovers that Asmaa, Pinar's best friend, is his sister. Asmaa knows everything now and Pinar has to tell both of them. Beginning with episode 86 everybody knows everything and a feud starts between the two families. Omer forgives Pinar and tells her that whatever happens she will always have a special place in his heart.

2008 Turkish television series debuts